This Is Me: Pride Celebration Spectacular is a Disney+ special that aired on June 27, 2021.

References

2020s American television specials
2021 television specials
American LGBT-related television shows
Disney+ original programming
LGBT-related television specials